Philip Rabinowitz (August 14, 1926 – July 21, 2006) was an American and Israeli applied mathematician. He was best known for his work in numerical analysis, including his books A First Course in Numerical Analysis with Anthony Ralston and Methods of Numerical Integration with Philip J. Davis. He was the author of numerous articles on numerical computation.

He earned his Ph.D. in 1951 under Walter Gottschalk at the University of Pennsylvania. He worked for the American National Bureau of Standards and taught at the Weizmann Institute of Science in Israel.

References

External links
Personal web page at the Weizmann Institute of Science

20th-century American mathematicians
21st-century American mathematicians
1926 births
2006 deaths
Academic staff of Weizmann Institute of Science